Army Stadium Peshawar also known as Karnal Sher Khan Stadium is located in Peshawar, Khyber Pakhtunkhwa, Peshawar. The stadium is owned & operated by Pakistan Army and it is also responsible for development of the stadium.

Overview And History 
Army Stadium Peshawar is an open entertainment and recreational site in Peshawar, Khyber Pakhtunkhwa, Pakistan. The stadium was renamed to Karnal Sher Khan Shaheed Stadium in 1999, in the memory of Karnal Sher Khan Shaheed, who was martyred in the Kargil war with India.

The stadium has restaurants & take aways, shopping stalls, music stores, amusement parks and gaming facilities. These facilities are now been shifted to adjacent Sher Khan Shaheed Park Complex. Since December 2016, McDonald has also started functioning plus soft launch of Food Court Complex to house Tutti Fruiti, Nan Bar, Peshawari Baithak and Chaman Ice Cream at the moment.

It is situated in one of Peshawar city's posh locality in close proximity to a number of important buildings and structure.  New mega structures are also planned here for generating economic activity in order to enhance social uplift & development and give this historic city a futuristic outlook, the one it deserves in line with other major cities of Pakistan while the present stadium will be right sized.

See also 
 Shahi Bagh Peshawar
 Wazir Bagh Peshawar
 Jinnah Park Peshawar

References

Entertainment districts in Pakistan
Music venues in Pakistan
Sport in Peshawar
Shopping districts and streets in Pakistan
Buildings and structures in Peshawar
Parks in Khyber Pakhtunkhwa